Serine/threonine-protein kinase WNK3, also known as protein kinase lysine-deficient 3, is a protein that in humans is encoded by the WNK3 gene.

Function 

WNK3 is a protein belonging to the 'with no lysine' family of serine-threonine protein kinases. These family members lack the catalytic lysine in subdomain II, and instead have a conserved lysine in subdomain I. This family member functions as a positive regulator of the transcellular Ca2+ transport pathway, and it plays a role in the increase of cell survival in a caspase 3 dependent pathway.

References

Further reading

EC 2.7.11